Jack Orr was a Scotland international rugby union player.

Rugby Union career

Amateur career

He played for West of Scotland.

Provincial career

He played for Glasgow District in the 1885 inter-city match against Edinburgh District on 5 December 1885.

He played for West of Scotland District in their match against East of Scotland District on 29 January 1887.

International career

He scored 3 tries in those 12 matches; all at the start of his international career: his first 3 matches.

Military career

The Scottish Referee newspaper of 5 October 1900 gives this on Orr's career:
Jack Orr. To Rugby followers particularly, the announcement made this week of Captain J. E. Orr's promotion to be Secretary to the Military Governor of Pretoria will be received with much satisfaction. As Rugby footballer, Jack Orr was a power in himself, and, indeed, played a game particularly his own, but with telling effect, not only in club games, but in the more important International matches. Captain Orr was, until recently, attached to the Imperial Light Horse, and was wounded, although not severely. early in the campaign. Since his recovery he has played a conspicuous part, and the post which has been gives him is but a fitting reward for services rendered. We wish him every success, and hope his advancement will not stop here.

Family

He was the brother of Charles Orr who was also capped for Scotland.

References

Sources

 Bath, Richard (ed.) The Scotland Rugby Miscellany (Vision Sports Publishing Ltd, 2007 )

1868 births
1935 deaths
Glasgow District (rugby union) players
Rugby union players from Hamilton, South Lanarkshire
Scotland international rugby union players
Scottish rugby union players
West of Scotland District (rugby union) players
West of Scotland FC players
Rugby union forwards